The Son of Safatba'al inscription is a Phoenician inscription (KAI 9) dated to c. 500-475 BCE.

It was published in Maurice Dunand's Fouilles de Byblos (volume I, 1926–1932, numbers 1143, plate XXXIII).

It is currently at the National Museum of Beirut.

Text of the inscription
Three parts of the inscription are extant. The largest, fragment A (six lines), reads:

{|
|+ 
|-
| (line A1a) || [’NK *** B]N ŠPṬB‘L MLK GBL || [I, *** (name unknown), the so]n of Safatbaal, King of Byblos,
|-
| (A1b) || P‘LT LY HMŠKB ZN [... || I made for myself this resting-place (tomb) [...
|-
| (A2a) || ...]BYTK BL T[QM LŠT] ’RN ‘LT ’RN || ...] your tomb (?). You shall not per[sist in placing] coffin upon coffin.
|-
| (A2b) || ‘L KN P‘L[T LY HMŠKB ZN ... || For this reason have I mad[e for myself this resting-place ...
|-
| (A3a) || ... WP‘L ’NK ’RN ZN L]Y BMŠKB ZN ’Š ’NK ŠKB BN || ... and I made this coffin for mys]elf in this resting-place that I (am) lying in.
|-
| (A3b) || WBMQM [ZN ... || And in [this] place [...
|-
| (A4) || ...]LY ’N[K ..]TY BRBM WYTN ’NK ’[... || ...] for myself I [...] among the generals. And I gave [...
|-
| (A5) || ... ’L TPT]Ḥ ‘[LT HMŠKB] ZN LRGZ ‘ṢMY ’[M... || ... you shall not ope]n this [resting-place] to disturb my bones. [...
|-
| (A6) || ...(?)ŠM]Š ‘L[M... || ... Ete]rnal Se[mes (Sun-goddess) (?) ...
|}

Two smaller fragments, B and C, have been joined together and are now known as fragment B. It reads:
{|
|+ 
|-
| (line B1) || ...]H[... || ...
|-
| (B2) || ... ’L TP‘L LK MŠK]B ’ṢL HMŠK[B ZN ... || ... You shall not make for yourself a resting-pla]ce (tomb) adjacent to [this] resting-pla[ce! ...
|-
| (B3) || ...]QR HMŠKB ’Š TP[TḤ... || ...]QR(?) the resting-place that you op[en ...
|-
| (B4) || ... ’L YŠT ’Y]T ’RNW ‘LT ’RN ’N[K... || ... Let him not place] his coffin upon a coffin. I[...
|-
| (B5) || ... B‘LŠM]M WB‘L ’DR WB‘LT WKL ’[LN GBL ... || ... Baalsame]m and Baal ’Iddīr and Baalat and all the god[s of Byblos ... 
|-
| (B6) || ...]B‘LT WKL [’L ... || ...] Baalat and all the [gods ...
|}

Bibliography
 Christopher Rollston, "The Dating of the Early Royal Byblian Phoenician Inscriptions: A Response to Benjamin Sass."  MAARAV 15 (2008): 57–93.
 Benjamin Mazar, The Phoenician Inscriptions from Byblos and the Evolution of the Phoenician-Hebrew Alphabet, in The Early Biblical Period: Historical Studies (S. Ahituv and B. A. Levine, eds., Jerusalem: IES, 1986 [original publication: 1946]): 231–247.
 William F. Albright, The Phoenician Inscriptions of the Tenth Century B.C. from Byblus, JAOS 67 (1947): 153–154.

References

Phoenician inscriptions
Collections of the National Museum of Beirut
Archaeological artifacts
KAI inscriptions